Monic Gabrielle Cecconi-Botella (born 30 September 1936) is a French pianist, music educator and composer.

Life
She was born in Courbevoie and studied at the Paris Conservatoire with Maurice Duruflé, Jean Rivier and Henri Dutilleux. After completing her studies, she worked as professor of music theory at the Conservatoire of Aubervilliers. In 1983, she became a professor of music analysis at the Paris Conservatoire.

In 1966, Cecconi-Botella won a First at the Prix de Rome. Her opera Noctuaile won a Grand Prix du Disque. In 2008, she founded the Festival Seasons of the Voice in Gordes, Provence.

Works
Cecconi-Botella explores multi-media arts in her compositions. Selected works include:
Bucolique for flute and piano
Cérémonie for viola and piano
Noctuaile opera in two parts, libretto by René David
He Signed Vincent (about the life of Vincent van Gogh)
The Woman of the Ogre, opera, book by Pierrette Fleutiaux
Operaclown, children's opera, libretto by René Pillot
Pirlipipi, children's opera, libretto by Pierre Gripari
Triangle Crystal, children's opera, book by Françoise Arquetout

References

Further reading
 Andrieux, Françoise: "Cecconi-Botella, Monic", in The New Grove Dictionary of Music and Musicians, second edition, edited by Stanley Sadie and John Tyrrell (London: Macmillan, 2001).

External links
 Monic Cecconi-Botella website

1936 births
20th-century classical composers
20th-century French composers
20th-century French women musicians
Conservatoire de Paris alumni
Women opera composers
French women classical composers
French music educators
French opera composers
Living people
People from Courbevoie
Prix de Rome for composition
Women music educators
20th-century women composers